A wood scraper block, also known as wooden agogo or tone wood block, is an idiophone percussion instrument. It consists, usually, in a pair of small tubes made of wood, each one of different size, producing different tones. These tubes are played with a stick and have a ribbed surface to double as scraper. Originally proposed by Matin Cohen from Latin Percussion, imitating a Brazilian agogô and Latin güiro, this instrument is also manufactured with a single block or with three blocks.

See also
Temple block
Wood block
Jam block

References

External links
Video
Types 

Tube percussion idiophones
Brazilian percussion
Hand percussion
Unpitched percussion instruments
Musical instruments played with drum sticks